Astronauts & Heretics is the fourth studio album by English new wave/synth-pop musician Thomas Dolby, released in 1992. It was Dolby's last studio album until 2011's A Map of the Floating City and his last album to be released on vinyl.

The album was met with some success in the UK. However, according to Dolby, the album went largely unnoticed in the US due to poor distribution by Giant Records and the popularity of grunge at the time.

After asking Dolby for help with his studio equipment, Eddie Van Halen agreed to play guitar on two songs on the album: "Eastern Bloc" and "Close But No Cigar", including a Van Halen-style solo on the former.

Track listing

Personnel

Musicians
 Thomas Dolby – vocals, piano (tracks 1, 3, 4, 9), keyboards (tracks 1, 2, 5–7), organ (tracks 3, 8), rhythm guitar (track 4), programs (track 4), synthesizer (track 8)
 Wayne Toups – Cajun accordion (track 1), background vocals (track 1)
 Michael Doucet – Cajun fiddle (tracks 1, 3), background vocals (track 1)
 Al Tharp – Cajun banjo (track 1), background vocals (track 1)
 Terry Jackson – bass guitar (tracks 1, 4, 7)
 Larry Treadwell – guitar (tracks 1, 3, 4, 6, 8), rhythm guitar (track 5), slide guitar (track 5)
 Suzanne Malline – background vocals (track 1)
 Cynthia Moliere – background vocals (track 1)
 Teresita Alsander – background vocals (track 1)
 Eddi Reader – guest vocal (track 2)
 Matthew Seligman – fretless bass (track 2), bass (tracks 3, 5, 6, 8)
 Jimmy Breaux – Cajun accordion (track 3)
 Mr. Pits – background vocals (tracks 3, 5)
 Loz Netto – background vocals (tracks 3, 5)
 Marcus Wallis – background vocals (tracks 3, 5)
 Laura Creamer – background vocals (tracks 3, 5)
 Jon E. Love – lead guitar (track 4)
 Eddie Van Halen – lead guitar (track 5), guitar (track 6)
 Jill Colucci – background vocals (track 6)
 Mike Kapitan – commentator (track 6), additional programming (track 7)
 Ofra Haza – guest vocal (track 7)
 Tommy Gutman Sanchez – guitar (track 7)
 Jimmy Z – sax (track 7)
 Rafael Padilla – percussion (track 7)
 Budgie – drums (track 8)
 David Owens – drums (tracks 8, 9)
 Jon Klein – guitar (track 8)
 Leland Sklar – bass (track 9)
 Jerry Garcia – lead guitar (track 9)
 Bob Weir – rhythm guitar (track 9)

Technical
 Thomas Dolby – producer, engineer
 Jay Baumgardner – mixing (track 8), assistant engineer
 Paul Gomarsall – engineer (track 8)
 Charles Paakkari – engineer (track 8)
 Larry Vigon – art director, design
 Brian Jackson – design
 Joyce Tenneson – photography
 Mary Coller – executive producer
 Greg Marchant – assistant engineer
 Phil Reynolds – assistant engineer
 Steve Himelfarb – assistant engineer
 Doug Michael – assistant engineer
 Elaine Anderson – assistant engineer
 Squeak Stone – assistant engineer
 Chuck Fedko – assistant engineer
 Robert Read – assistant engineer
 John Cutler – assistant engineer

Charts

References

Thomas Dolby albums
1992 albums
Albums produced by Thomas Dolby
Giant Records (Warner) albums
Virgin Records albums